The 1898–99 season was the 28th season of competitive football in England.

Events

This was the first season in which automatic promotion/relegation was introduced between the First and Second divisions. Both Divisions were expanded to 18 teams.

The new teams to join the Second Division were: Barnsley, Glossop North End and New Brighton Tower. Burslem Port Vale also returned to the Football League.

On 26 November 1898, the First Division match between The Wednesday and Aston Villa was abandoned after 79 minutes due to bad light. Rather than let the score stand or replay the whole match, The Football Association ordered that the remaining 11 minutes should be played at Hillsborough on 13 March 1899. The Wednesday, who were leading 3–1 when the game was abandoned, scored one more goal to win 4–1.

Honours

Notes = Number in parentheses is the times that club has won that honour. * indicates new record for competition

League table

First Division

Second Division

References